Thomas Arthur Guy Hungerford, AM (5 May 191519 June 2011) was an Australian writer, noted for his World War II novel The Ridge and the River, and his short stories that chronicle growing up in South Perth, Western Australia during the Great Depression.

Early life
Hungerford was born in Perth, Western Australia on 5 May 1915. He grew up in South Perth, known then as the Queen Suburb, when the area was semi-rural, with market gardens.

World War Two
Hungerford served with the Australian Army in Darwin, New Guinea, Bougainville, Morotai and with the Occupation Forces in Japan. He was a sergeant in 2/8 Australian Commando Squadron.

In 2005 the ABC's 7.30 Report reported his  "unflinching depictions of jungle fighting are acknowledged as some of the best writing to come out of the war". Hungerford told the program he wasn't a hero: "I was one of a group of men all doing the same bloody thing. Sticking the head up, hoping to Christ it wouldn't be shot off." He left the army in 1947.

Journalism
After the war, Hungerford was a press secretary for Billy Hughes for three weeks. Upon leaving, Hungerford wrote to Hughes: "I will never work for you again. I'd rather go to bed with a sabre-toothed tiger". He then joined the Australia News and Information Bureau, and afterwards was a freelancer. He later worked as a press secretary to Western Australian Premiers John Tonkin and Sir Charles Court.

Writing
Hungerford began writing as a teenager and had his first published short story in 1942 in the Sydney Bulletin. His first volume of short fiction, Stories from Suburban Road, depict life during the Great Depression in the Perth riverside suburb of South Perth.

Novels
 The Ridge and the River (1950)
 Riverslake (1953)
 Sowers in the Wind (1954)
 Shake the Golden Bough (1963)
Sowers in the Wind, was held back by publisher Angus & Robertson because it dealt with the economic and sexual exploitation of the Japanese after the War by Australian occupation forces. The novel won the 1949 Sydney Morning Herald prize for literature but was not published until 1954.

Monash University's Robin Gerster told The Age in 2002: "Hungerford... wrote very perceptively and affectionately about the Japanese, which is not a bad effort for someone who fought them."

Short stories
 Wong Chu and the Queen's Letterbox (1976)
 The Only One Who Forgot (1951)
 What Happened to Joseph? (2005, a collection of short stories & poems)

Drama
 Stories from Suburban Road
 The Day It All Ended

Children's books
 Swagbelly Birdsnatcher and the Prince of Siam

Autobiography
 Stories From Suburban Road (1983)
 A Knockabout with a Slouch Hat
 Red Rover All Over

Non-fiction
 Fremantle, Landscapes and People (with photographer Roger Garwood) (1976)

Book reviews
 Selby, David. Hell and High Fever – reviewed in Quadrant 1/1 (Sum 1956/57): 93, 95.

Prizes and other honours
Hungerford won the Crouch Gold Medal for Literature (1951), the Patricia Hackett Short Story prize (1962), the WA Weekly Literature Prize for Fiction (1964), and the Patrick White Award (2002).

He was made a Member of the Order of Australia in 1987. A portrait of him, c.1963, by Kate O'Connor is in the National Library of Australia. In 2004, he was pronounced a Living Treasure of Western Australia by the Western Australian Government Michael Crouch's biography of Hungerford is called Literary Larrikin.

The T. A. G. Hungerford Award is named for him and is awarded every two years to an unpublished author in Western Australia.

References

External links
 Portrait of Hungerford in National Library of Australia
 Interview – ANZAC Day, 7.30 Report, ABC; 2005
 Background article, The Age, Melbourne; 2002
 Article, InterSector, Government of Western Australia; 2005
 Interview, Late Night Live, ABC; 2002

1915 births
2011 deaths
20th-century Australian novelists
Australian male novelists
Australian Army personnel of World War II
Australian male short story writers
Writers from Perth, Western Australia
Members of the Order of Australia
Patrick White Award winners
Australian male dramatists and playwrights
20th-century Australian dramatists and playwrights
ALS Gold Medal winners
20th-century Australian short story writers
20th-century Australian male writers
Australian Army soldiers